Streptomyces viridobrunneus is a bacterium species from the genus of Streptomyces. Streptomyces viridobrunneus produces cellulase.

See also 
 List of Streptomyces species

References

Further reading

External links
Type strain of Streptomyces viridobrunneus at BacDive – the Bacterial Diversity Metadatabase	

viridobrunneus
Bacteria described in 1986